Liang Chow (also known as Qiao Liang) (born January 1, 1968) is a Chinese-American former artistic gymnast.  He is the founder, owner, and head coach of Chow's Gymnastics and Dance Institute in West Des Moines, Iowa. He is notable for being the coach of 2008 Olympic balance beam champion Shawn Johnson and 2012 Olympic individual all-around champion Gabby Douglas.  He  coached senior US gymnasts Norah Flatley and Rachel Gowey and junior US gymnast Victoria Nguyen.

Biography
Growing up in Beijing, Chow was tapped by a district club at the age of 5 to train in gymnastics. He was on China's national gymnastics team for more than a decade, winning numerous national and international medals. However, he never competed in the Olympic Games; in 1988 he was too young to make the Chinese team, and before 1992 he suffered a back injury and retired from competition.
 
He moved to the United States in 1991 on the suggestion of his aunt, who was working on her Ph.D. at the University of Iowa. He accepted an English scholarship and a position as an assistant coach for the University of Iowa's men's gymnastics program. Afterwards he accepted a coaching job for the women's program. Following his experience working with female gymnasts, Chow decided to open his own gym to train gymnasts at a younger age, when they would be more flexible and open to learning new skills. He and his wife moved to West Des Moines and opened Chow's Gymnastics and Dance Institute on August 23, 1998. In June 2008, a flood destroyed the facilities.

Chow was the personal coach of Shawn Johnson since 1998. He began working with Gabby Douglas in 2010. He is known for his fatherly affection toward his proteges.  He was named the coach of the Chinese women's national gymnastics team in June 2018.

Personal
Chow is married to Liwen Zhuang, a former gymnast on the Chinese national team. They have one child named Olivia

International Elite Athletes 

 there were two International Elites training and competing at Chow's gym. Norah Flatley was a senior elite set to debut in 2017 (she was at senior level age from the beginning of 2016, out on injury since mid 2015). She is a beam specialist. Flatley competed at two national championships and three international assignments since her elite qualification in 2013.
Victoria Nguyen was also set to make her senior debut in 2017. She was at elite level since 2014, and competed at two national championships and one international assignment.
Former gymnast Rachel Gowey retired from elite gymnastics to pursue NCAA college gymnastics at the University of Florida. Before her retirement Gowey competed in two national championships, two international assignments and the 2016 Olympic Trials. She qualified elite in 2014.
Alexis Vasquez competed for Chow as an elite from 2013 through early 2015. She competed in two national championships before dropping down to Level 10 (accompanied by a gym move). As a result she forfeited her senior international debut and any possible international assignments.

References

External links
 Chow's Gymnastics and Dance Institute
 NBC Profile
 US Gymnastics profile

1968 births
Living people
American gymnastics coaches
American sportspeople of Chinese descent
Chinese emigrants to the United States
Chinese male artistic gymnasts
College men's gymnastics coaches in the United States
College women's gymnastics coaches in the United States
People from West Des Moines, Iowa
Gymnasts from Beijing
University of Iowa alumni
Asian Games medalists in gymnastics
Gymnasts at the 1990 Asian Games
Asian Games gold medalists for China
Medalists at the 1990 Asian Games